Susan Saltzman Fainstein (born September 27, 1938) is an American educator and scholar of urban planning. Fainstein is currently a Senior Research Fellow at the Harvard University Graduate School of Design. Her research and writing has focused on the distributive effects of urban development strategies and megaprojects, the role of democracy and community control in local public institutions, and establishing a moral theory of "the just city."

A member of the urban planning faculties of Columbia University and Rutgers University for most of her career, Fainstein is now a research scholar at the Harvard Graduate School of Design.

Work

Economic restructuring and urban development
Conducting field research in New York and London, Fainstein has studied the rise of "pro-growth" municipal regimes and accelerated real estate development since 1980. Her work charts the growth of public-private partnerships in urban development and increasing reliance on property development as a wholesale economic development strategy. Noting that property-focused growth has weakened urban welfare programs and broad neighborhood revitalization strategies, she has proposed reforms to public-private partnership structures that discourage overbuilding and permit broader community benefits.

Theory of the "Just City"
Since 1999 Fainstein has worked to theorize the "just city," a concept for which her 2010 book is named. Fainstein argues that urban planners need a normative theory of justice because their enthusiasm for social and built-environment diversity has not produced alternatives to inequality under pro-growth regimes. She maintains that the dominant "communicative planning" paradigm—in which sufficiently inclusive and deliberative planning procedures are said to yield just outcomes—cannot produce just outcomes. This is because they cannot resolve structural inequalities among actors, settle rival concepts of the public good, or account for progressive policies achieved in non-deliberative democratic societies. Because of these limitations, planning procedures permit outcomes incompatible with justice such as greater economic inequality, marginalization of social groups, and political domination.

Fainstein proposes an urban theory of justice in which "equity, "democracy," and diversity are the first-order concerns of urban development, with equity prevailing when such outcomes conflict. These principles aim to harmonize the contractarian "theory of justice" proposed by John Rawls with its post-liberal criticisms, particularly those of Iris Marion Young, who argues that the recognition of social group differences cannot be subordinated to individual distributive fairness. To reconcile tradeoffs among these priorities, Fainstein endorses the "capabilities approach" of Amartya Sen and Martha Nussbaum: all three norms must be upheld sufficiently such that they can be achieved by all moral subjects, while allowing subjects to choose priority among these basic principles.

Fainstein has upheld Amsterdam's social housing program as a model of the "just city" paradigm because it supports a mix of household types, permits ethnic concentration but not enclavism, and safeguards a basic living standard. Other scholars have argued that liberalizing structural reforms since 1980 have eroded the program's claims to provide housing equity and social diversity.

The topic has been engaged widely by planners and urban theorists since its introduction. Peter Marcuse and Oren Yiftachel have expanded on Fainstein's justice concept, calling for greater focus on property relations and recognition of planning paradigms outside the U.S. and Europe. More critical reception has come from urban geographer David Harvey who, extending his Marxist critique of urban planning, has argued that "just city" theory does not remedy the inherent injustices of capitalist urbanization but instead palliates them. Fainstein has responded that the approach attempts what is feasible within capitalist development and does not "depend on revolutionary change."

Personal life
Fainstein is married to urban sociology professor Norman I. Fainstein, who served previously as dean of arts and sciences at Baruch College in the City University of New York, dean of the faculty at Vassar College, and president of Connecticut College. In Fall 2019, Fainstein and her husband are co-teaching on "History and Theory of Urban Interventions" at the Harvard Graduate School of Design. She has two sons, Eric Bove and Paul Bove, and three grandchildren.

Citations

References

1938 births
Living people
American women political scientists
American political scientists
American political philosophers
Harvard Graduate School of Design faculty
MIT School of Humanities, Arts, and Social Sciences alumni
Harvard University alumni
Columbia University faculty
Rutgers University faculty
Urban theorists
American urban planners
Women urban planners
American women academics
21st-century American women